The 2011–12 Louisiana–Lafayette Ragin' Cajuns men's basketball team  represented the University of Louisiana at Lafayette during the 2011–12 NCAA Division I men's basketball season. The Ragin' Cajuns, led by second year head coach Bob Marlin, played their home games at the Cajundome and are members of the West Division of the Sun Belt Conference. They finished the season 16–16, 10–6 in Sun Belt play to finish in third place in the West Division. They lost in the quarterfinals of the Sun Belt Basketball tournament to North Texas. They were invited to the 2012 CollegeInsider.com Tournament where they lost in the first round to Rice.

Roster

Schedule

|-
!colspan=9 style=| Regular season

|-
!colspan=9 style=| Sun Belt tournament

|-
!colspan=9 style=| CollegeInsider.com tournament

References

Louisiana Ragin' Cajuns men's basketball seasons
Louisiana-Lafayette
Louisiana-Lafayette
Louisiana
Louisiana